Particle-induced gamma emission (PIGE) is a form of nuclear reaction analysis,  one of the ion beam analysis thin-film analytical techniques.

Technology

Typically, an MeV proton beam is directed onto a sample which may be tens of microns thick,  and the fast protons may excite the target nuclei such that gamma rays are emitted.  These may be used to characterise the sample.  For example,  sodium in glass is of great importance but can be hard to measure non destructively:  X-ray fluorescence (XRF) and particle-induced X-ray emission (PIXE) are both sensitive only to the surface few microns of the sample because of the low energy (and consequent high absorption coefficient) of the Na K X-rays (1.05 keV).  But, for example, the 23Na(p,p'γ)23Na reaction has a high and relatively well-known cross-section (see the IAEA "IBANDL" site) and is therefore frequently used for determining bulk sodium content of glasses,  since the gamma energy (440 keV) is so high that there is effectively no absorption.
The IAEA has sponsored the development of a database of PIGE cross-sections.

Applications
PIGE has been used to detect total fluorine as a screening tool for PFAS.

References

Medical imaging